Steven Bradbury (born 1973) is an Australian short track speed skater.

Steven or Stephen Bradbury may also refer to:

Steven G. Bradbury (born 1958), American lawyer
Stephen Bradbury (artist) (born 1954), British illustrator and painter

See also
Stephen Bradley (disambiguation)